The Key Route Inn was a major hotel in Oakland, California in the early decades of the 20th century. It was constructed by the Realty Syndicate of Francis "Borax" Smith and Frank C. Havens, a subsidiary of which was the Key Route transit system. The Inn opened on May 7, 1907, straddling what is now Grand Avenue along the west side of Broadway. President William Howard Taft and his party were guests in 1909. The building was a massive wood-framed structure with open timbering, in imitation of an old English style. One of its most remarkable features was a large archway and corridor through which the tracks of one of the Key Route's transbay lines passed. A Key Route stop in this corridor connected to the hotel's main lobby.

The Key Route Inn suffered major fire damage on September 8, 1930. This, combined with the beginning of the Great Depression and the City of Oakland's desire to connect Grand Avenue with 22nd Street led to the Inn being fully demolished in April and May, 1932, only 25 years after it opened.

The rail line continued, however,  becoming the "B" transbay line upon the opening of the San Francisco–Oakland Bay Bridge railway. The rail line was replaced by the "B" bus route in April 1958, and was subsequently incorporated into the publicly owned AC Transit system; the modern line B route bypasses the location of the former hotel by nearly a mile.

See also
 Claremont Hotel & Spa, a sister hotel opened in 1915 which still exists.

References
 Oakland Herald, May 7, 1907
 Oakland Tribune, September 8–9, 1930; April 28, 1932

External links

 Photo of the Inn shortly before it burned, Oakland Public Library collection

Hotel buildings completed in 1907
Buildings and structures in Oakland, California
History of Oakland, California
Demolished hotels in California
Hotels established in 1907
Tudor Revival architecture in California
1907 establishments in California
1932 disestablishments in California
1930 fires in the United States
Hotels in the San Francisco Bay Area
Railway stations in the United States opened in 1907
Railway stations closed in 1958
Railway stations in Oakland, California
Buildings and structures demolished in 1932